Bob Harkey (June 23, 1930January 16, 2016) was an American driver in the USAC Championship Car series from Charlotte, North Carolina. He raced in the 1963–1979 seasons, with 85 career starts, including the Indianapolis 500 in 1964, 1971 and 1973–1976.  He finished in the top ten 23 times, with his best finish in 4th position in 1964 at Trenton.

He made one NASCAR start, which also happened to be the first race at Daytona International Speedway. Driving a Chevrolet for Buck Baker, Harkey placed 10th in the 1959 NASCAR Convertible Division race supporting the inaugural Daytona 500. He also entered the 500 but withdrew.

Harkey's first experiences with speed came as the driver of a decoy car during moonshine runs. He worked as a stunt driver for movies such as Thunder Road, Speedway and Winning. Harkey was also an accomplished stunt pilot and wing walker. He owned a Stearman and an AT-6, with which he taught fellow drivers such as Johnny Rutherford to fly.

Harkey also trained as a boxer, and once fought eventual world heavyweight champion Floyd Patterson in the Golden Gloves.

For many years, Harkey worked with Champion Spark Plugs' safety program.

On January 16, 2016, he died in Indianapolis at the age of 85.

Indianapolis 500 results

1975: Relieved by Salt Walther (laps 18-162)

References

External links
Driver Database Profile

1930 births
2016 deaths
Indianapolis 500 drivers
Racing drivers from Charlotte, North Carolina
USAC Silver Crown Series drivers